The 1992 Australian Touring Car season was the 33rd year of touring car racing in Australia since the first runnings of the Australian Touring Car Championship and the fore-runner of the present day Bathurst 1000, the Armstrong 500.

There were 13 touring car race meetings held during 1992; a nine-round series, the 1992 Australian Touring Car Championship (ATCC); a support programme event at the 1992 Australian Grand Prix, the Winfield Triple Challenge at Eastern Creek Raceway, and two stand alone long distance races, nicknamed 'enduros'.

1992 was the last year of the FIA's Group A touring cars in Australia. Group A, which had been Australia's touring car category since 1985, was to be replaced by the 5.0 Litre V8 Group 3A Touring Cars (the fore-runner of V8 Supercars) from 1993. This would see the end of turbocharged cars in Australian touring car racing, with cars such as the Nissan Skyline GT-R and Ford Sierra RS500 banned from racing at the end of 1992.

The 1993 spec cars made their first appearance in the 1992 Don't Drink Drive Sandown 500, with three Holden VP Commodores and one Ford EB Falcon being raced. The Falcon, which had not raced at all in Group A in Australia, had not been seen in touring car racing since the final year of the locally developed Group C category in 1984.

Results and standings

Race calendar
The 1992 Australian touring car season consisted of 13 events.

Winfield Triple Challenge
Held at Eastern Creek Raceway this was a pre-season race meeting which featured superbikes and drag racing as well as touring cars to complete the Winfield Triple Challenge. Glenn Seton won both of the two Group 3A races.

Australian Touring Car Championship

Sandown 500

Tooheys 1000

Clarks Shoes Group A Finale
This meeting was a support event of the 1992 Australian Grand Prix.

References

Linked articles contain additional references.

Australian Touring Car Championship
Touring Cars